Romulus is an unincorporated community in Pottawatomie County, Oklahoma, United States. It is located east of U.S. Route 177/State Highway 3W.

References

Unincorporated communities in Pottawatomie County, Oklahoma
Unincorporated communities in Oklahoma